Domenico Contarini (Birthdate unknown, died 1071 in Venice) was the 30th Doge of Venice. His reign lasted from his election in 1043 following the death of Domenico Flabanico until his own death in 1071. During his reign, the Venetians recaptured Zadar (in present-day Croatia) and parts of Dalmatia that had been lost to the Kingdom of Croatia in the previous few decades. The Venetian naval fleet was heavily built up during his reign, the economy thrived, and the Republic of Venice had reasserted its control over much of the Mediterranean Sea.

Life

After the capture of Zadar, Venice entered into an era of peace. Domenico maintained friendly relations with the Byzantine Emperors, the Pope in Rome, and the Holy Roman Emperor, Henry III.

Contarini was a liberal builder of churches and monasteries, such as San Nicolò di Lido in Lido di Venezia and Sant'Angelo di Concordia. In 1071, just before his death, he commissioned builders to begin work on expanding and restoring St Mark's Basilica.

By his wish, he was buried at the church of San Nicolò al Lido when he died. His tomb is above the main doorway, surmounted by a portrait bust which shows him wearing the "corno," the distinctive doge's hat. His son, Enrico Contarini, was Bishop of Castello from 1074 to 1108. Enrico was the spiritual leader of an expedition to the Holy Land in 1099–1100 that brought back the remains of Saint Nicholas and Saint Theodore the Martyr.

Family

The Contarini were one of the oldest Venetian families whose origins are often linked to the beginning of the city itself. The first historically verified documentation of the Contarini shows up in 960. Over the centuries, the family had branched out and rooted itself in over 20 familial lines. Domenico was the first Doge of the Contarini family. By 1797, when the last Doge reigned, the family would produce 8 doges of their own, including Domenico.

References

Sources 
Rendina, Claudio. (2003). I Dogi. Storia e segreti. 2.ed. Rome. 

1071 deaths
Domenico 01
11th-century Doges of Venice
Year of birth unknown